Rampa may refer to:

Rampa (film), working title of Sompa, 2012 Indian film
Rampa, Natal, station and transport connection in Natal, Rio Grande do Norte, Brazil
La Rampa, street in the Vedado district of Havana, Cuba
Lobsang Rampa (1910–1981), pen name of Cyril Henry Hoskin, British spiritual writer
Rampa Rattanarithikul (born 1939), Thai entomologist

See also
Rampa Rebellion (disambiguation)